Tiffani Tamara Johnson (born December 27, 1975) is an American former professional basketball player. She played in the Women's National Basketball Association (WNBA) for the Sacramento Monarchs, Houston Comets and Seattle Storm. Johnson won a WNBA championship with the Comets in 2000. She played college basketball for the Tennessee Lady Volunteers and won two NCAA championships in 1996 and 1997.

High school career
Johnson attended Garinger High School in Charlotte, North Carolina, and was selected as North Carolina Miss Basketball in 1994. She was considered one of the most dominant players in state history as she averaged 28 points and 20 rebounds per game during her senior season. Johnson committed to play college basketball for the Tennessee Lady Volunteers for its tradition and intensity level.

College career
Johnson won her first NCAA championship with the Lady Volunteers in 1996 as she scored 16 points in the title game. At the end of the season, she was suspended for disciplinary reasons and barred from attending team functions including visiting the White House. Johnson won a second NCAA championship with the Lady Volunteers in 1997. She was dropped from the team in 1997 before her senior season by head coach Pat Summitt for disciplinary reasons.

Professional career
Johnson declared for the 1998 American Basketball League (ABL) draft, and was selected as the 26th overall pick by the San Jose Lasers.

Johnson was included on the training camp roster of the Los Angeles Sparks during the 1999 season.

Johnson was a starter for the Houston Comets when they won a WNBA championship in 2000.

On February 22, 2004, Johnson signed with the Houston Stealth of the National Women's Basketball League.

On May 18, 2005, Johnson was waived by the Comets. At the time, she ranked fourth all-time with the Comets in games played (150), total rebounds (643) and blocked shots (79).

Johnson played for the Seattle Storm during the 2006 season as a late addition to the team.

On April 2, 2008, Johnson signed a training camp deal with the New York Liberty. She was waived by the team on May 14, 2008.

Personal life
Johnson graduated from the University of Tennessee with a bachelor's degree in criminal justice. She is a cousin of fellow basketball player Ivory Latta.

References

External links
Career statistics

1975 births
American women's basketball players
Centers (basketball)
Houston Comets players
Sacramento Monarchs players
Seattle Storm players
Basketball players from Charlotte, North Carolina
Tennessee Lady Volunteers basketball players
Living people